Byrne Offutt is an American actor who has appeared in movies, television, commercials, animation, video games, radio, and the stage.

Career 
In 1990, three weeks after moving to Los Angeles, Offutt booked the first part he auditioned for playing the boyfriend of Nicole Eggert on Charles in Charge.

Other television appearances include recurring roles on Kickin' It, The Young and the Restless and Significant Others as well as appearances on Law & Order: Los Angeles, Justified, The Secret Life of the American Teenager, Frasier, Pushing Daisies, Lie to Me, Criminal Minds, Two and a Half Men, E-Ring and NCIS. He has also done voices on animated series such as W.I.T.C.H. and Futurama. On the theatre circuit, he has played Pink in Pink Floyd's The Wall at The Actors' Gang Theatre.

He voices the character of Uriah on the Disney cartoon W.I.T.C.H. as well as appearing in 44 episodes of Futurama. He plays several characters in the video games Hitman: Blood Money and Kameo: Elements of Power and, most recently, played the character of Chalmers in Medal of Honor: Airborne.

Filmography

Film

Television

External links
 
 Bob and Byrne Comedy Videos
 http://www.byrneoffutt.com

American male television actors
American male voice actors
Living people
Year of birth missing (living people)